Radisav Ćurčić (born September 26, 1965) is a Serbian-Israeli former professional basketball player. He represented the Yugoslavia national basketball team internationally.

Playing career 
A center, Ćurčić played 17 seasons in Yugoslavia, Italy, Turkey, and Israel, from 1986 to 2002. During his playing days, he played for Železničar Čačak, Smelt Olimpija, APU Udine, the Dallas Mavericks, Dinamo Sassari, Maccabi Tel Aviv, Tuborg, Hapoel Jerusalem, and Fenerbahçe. He retired as a player with Maccabi Tel Aviv in 2002.

National team career
In August 1990, Ćurčić was a member of the Yugoslavia national team that won a gold medal at the FIBA World Championship in Argentina. Over six tournament games, he averaged 2.3 points per game.

Career achievements and awards
Trophies
 FIBA SuproLeague champion: 1  (with Maccabi Tel Aviv: 2000–01)
 Israeli Premier League champion: 4  (with Maccabi Tel Aviv: 1994–95, 1995–96, 2000–01, 2001–02)
 Israeli State Cup winner: 2  (with Maccabi Tel Aviv: 2001, 2002)

Individual awards
Israeli Basketball Premier League MVP — 1999

NBA career statistics

Regular season 

|-
| align="left" | 1992–93
| align="left" | Dallas
| 20 || 0 || 8.3 || .390 || — || .722 || 2.5 || .6 || .4 || .1 || 2.9
|}

See also 
 List of Serbian NBA players

References

External links
nba.com/historical/playerfile
Lega Basket Serie A Profile
TBLStat.net Profile
Radisav Ćurčić at MaccabiFans 

1965 births
Living people
Basketball players from Čačak
1990 FIBA World Championship players
Centers (basketball)
Dallas Mavericks players
Dinamo Sassari players
Fenerbahçe men's basketball players
FIBA World Championship-winning players
Hapoel Jerusalem B.C. players
Israeli Basketball Premier League players
Israeli people of Serbian descent
KK Borac Čačak players
KK Olimpija players
KK Železničar Čačak players
Maccabi Tel Aviv B.C. players
National Basketball Association players from Israel
National Basketball Association players from Serbia
Naturalized citizens of Israel
Serbian emigrants to Israel
Serbian expatriate basketball people in Israel
Serbian expatriate basketball people in Italy
Serbian expatriate basketball people in Slovenia
Serbian expatriate basketball people in Turkey
Serbian expatriate basketball people in the United States
Serbian men's basketball players
Tuborg Pilsener basketball players
Undrafted National Basketball Association players
Yugoslav men's basketball players